Vladimir Maslovskiy (born 20 December 2000) is a Belarusian professional footballer who plays for Molodechno.

References

External links 
 
 

2000 births
Living people
Belarusian footballers
Association football midfielders
FC Energetik-BGU Minsk players
FC Smorgon players
FC Molodechno players